Martin Dies Jr. State Park is a 705-acre recreation area located along U.S. Route 190 on the banks of the Steinhagen Reservoir in Jasper and Tyler counties in Texas. The park is managed by the Texas Parks and Wildlife Department which leased the park's land from the United States Army Corps of Engineers in 1964, and officially opened it as Dam B State Park in 1965, renaming it to honor State Senator Martin Dies Jr. the same year. The park consists of three units; Hen House Ridge Unit, Walnut Ridge Unit and Cherokee Unit. Cherokee Unit is a day use area only, whereas the other two units allow camping.

The park offers recreational activities such as paddling, fishing, swimming, hiking, cycling, and volleyball. The park's distance from major cities means dark skies and it offers stargazing events at times.

Nature
The park sits on the northern edge of the Big Thicket and south of where the Angelina River and Neches River meet. The two ecosystems contribute to the wide variety of plants and animals in the park.

Common mammals in the park include white-tailed deer, raccoons, Virginia opossums, nine-banded armadillos, and three different squirrel species. Red and gray foxes and bobcats make rare appearances.

The park is heavily forested. Loblolly, longleaf and shortleaf pines are abundant throughout the park. Bald cypress trees are found around the wetland areas. Water oak, southern red oak, sweet gum and Southern magnolia dot the landscape. Smaller trees and shrubs such American beautyberry, wax myrtle, yaupon holly grow under the larger trees.

External links

 Martin Dies Jr. State Park at Texas Parks and Wildlife Department

State parks of Texas
Protected areas of Jasper County, Texas
Protected areas of Tyler County, Texas
Protected areas established in 1965
1965 establishments in Texas